Ectoedemia subbimaculella is a moth of the family Nepticulidae. It is found in most of Europe, east to Smolensk, Kaluganorth and the Volga and Ural regions of Russia.

The wingspan is 5–6 mm. The head is orange. Antennal eyecaps whitish. Forewings are dark fuscous with an ochreous-whitish small basal spot, another on middle of costa, and a larger triangular spot on dorsum before tornus; tips of apical cilia whitish. Hindwings grey.

The larvae feed on Castanea sativa, Quercus frainetto, Quercus macranthera, Quercus petraea, Quercus pubescens, Quercus pyrenaica, Quercus robur and Quercus rubra. They mine the leaves of their host plant. The mine consists of a narrow corridor, filled with frass, running along a vein (usually the midrib, but sometimes a lateral vein and then running in the direction of the midrib). The corridor widens into a blotch. The larva makes a slit in the lower epidermis of the blotch, by which part of the frass is ejected. Pupation takes place outside of the mine.

References

External links
bladmineerders.nl
Ectoedemia subbimaculella images at  Consortium for the Barcode of Life
Nepticulidae from the Volga and Ural region
UKmoths
Swedish moths

Nepticulidae
Moths of Europe
Moths of Asia
Moths described in 1828